Kugelberg is a Swedish surname that may refer to
Björn Kugelberg (1905–1980), Swedish sprinter
Eric Kugelberg (1913–1983), Swedish neurophysiologist known for Kugelberg–Welander disease 
Erik Kugelberg (1891–1975), Swedish track and field athlete 
Frederik Kugelberg (1880—1963), Swedish physician and Christian missionary 

Swedish-language surnames